Roza Isakovna Otunbayeva (Kyrgyz: Роза Исаковна (Исак кызы) Отунбаева, Roza Isakovna (Isak kyzy) Otunbayeva; born August 23, 1950) is a Kyrgyz diplomat and politician who served as the President of Kyrgyzstan from 7 April 2010 until 1 December 2011, becoming the first female Central Asian head of state. She was sworn in on July 3, 2010, after acting as interim leader following the 2010 April Revolution, which led to the ousting of President Kurmanbek Bakiyev. She previously served as Minister of Foreign Affairs and as head of the parliamentary caucus for the Social Democratic Party of Kyrgyzstan.

Since 2022, Otunbayeva has been serving as United Nations Secretary-General António Guterres’ Special Representative for Afghanistan and Head of the United Nations Assistance Mission in Afghanistan (UNAMA).

Early life
Roza Otunbayeva was born in Frunze (now Bishkek, the capitol of Kyrgyzstan), Kirghiz SSR, USSR into the family of Isak Otunbayev, a member of the Supreme Court of Kyrgyz SSR (1967–1992), and Salika Daniyarova (1925–2020), a teacher. She graduated from the Philosophy Faculty of Moscow State University in 1972 and went on to teach as Senior Teacher and then as Head of the Philosophy Department at Kyrgyz State National University for six years (1975–1981). 

In 1975, she became Candidate of Sciences after defending her dissertation, "Critique of falsification of Marxist-Leninist dialectic by the philosophers of Frankfurt school".

Otunbayeva is a divorced mother of two children. She is fluent in Russian, English, German and French in addition to Kyrgyz.

Political career
In 1981, she began her political career as the Communist Party's Second Secretary of the Lenin raion council (raikom) of Frunze (now Bishkek). From 1983 to 1986, Otunbayeva served as the Secretary of the City Communist Party Committee in Frunze (now Bishkek). In 1986, she was appointed the Deputy to the Chairman of the Council of Ministers, and the same time the Minister of Foreign Affairs of the Kirghiz Soviet Socialist Republic. In 1989, she was appointed as the Executive Secretary and later as the Chairwoman of the USSR UNESCO National Committee, and she also became member of the USSR Foreign Ministry's Board. From 1989–1992, she served as the Vice-President of the UNESCO Executive Council. 

By 1992, the now independent Kyrgyzstan was led by Askar Akayev, who chose her to be Minister of Foreign Affairs and Deputy Prime Minister, positions she held until later that year when she became her country's first ambassador to the US and Canada (1992–1994). In May 1994 she was called back to her original post of Kyrgyz Minister of Foreign Affairs, remaining there for three years. From 1997 to 2002, she served as the first Kyrgyz ambassador to the United Kingdom of Great Britain and Northern Ireland. From 2002 to 2004, she was recruited Deputy Special Representative of the UN Secretary General in the Peacekeeping Mission for Georgia.
Upon her return to Kyrgyzstan in late 2004, Otunbayeva became politically active. In December 2004, she and three other opposition parliamentarians founded the Ata-Jurt (Fatherland) public movement in preparation for the February 2005 parliamentary elections.

From March to September 2005, Otunbayeva served as Acting Minister of Foreign Affairs.

"Tulip Revolution"

Otunbayeva was one of the key leaders of the Tulip Revolution in Kyrgyzstan which led to the overthrow of President Akayev. Subsequently, she served for a few months as Acting Foreign Minister in the interim government of then prime minister (and acting president) Kurmanbek Bakiyev. After Bakiyev was elected President and Feliks Kulov became Prime Minister, Otunbayeva failed to receive the required parliamentary support to become Foreign Minister. 

She then ran unsuccessfully in a parliamentary by-election a few months later. Otunbayeva played a key role in the November 2006 protests that pressed successfully for a new democratic constitution.

She was the co-chairwoman of the country's Asaba (Flag) National Revival Party for a short time. In December 2007, Otunbayeva was elected to the Jogorku Kenesh – the Parliament of Kyrgyzstan – on the list of the Social Democratic Party of Kyrgyzstan. She served as the Leader of the Opposition SDP from 2008 to 2010. In 2009 she became the Leader of People's Front opposition.

2010 uprising and presidency

On 7 April 2010, she was chosen by opposition leaders as head of the Interim Government of the Kyrgyz Republic, following widespread rioting in Bishkek and the ouster of President Kurmanbek Bakiyev.

Bakiyev fled the Jalal-Abad area as the riots became more violent. Unable to rally support, he resigned as president on 10 April 2010, and left the country for Kazakhstan. Nine days later he went to Minsk, Belarus, where he was given protected-exile status. On 21 April, he recanted his resignation and declared that he was still president of Kyrgyzstan. Otunbayeva vowed to bring him to trial.

As interim president, Otunbayeva had four male deputies. Otunbayeva is considered to be unusual as there are few women in politics in Kyrgyzstan. Her first conversation after she came to power was with Russian Prime Minister Vladimir Putin. Otunbayeva declared that new elections would be called within six months and that she would act as president until then.

With violent protests in support of ousted President Kurmanbek Bakiyev continuing in Jalalabad, the home city of the former president, it was announced on 19 May  2010, by the interim government that elections would be delayed until 2011 and Otunbayeva was named as president. Following a referendum on the new Kyrgyz constitution, she was sworn in on 3 July 2010. Otunbayeva however was prohibited by the new constitution from running in the 2011 presidential election and her term ended on 31 December 2011. 

The referendum was supported by over 90% and changed the government from a Presidential republic to a Parliamentary republic. Parliamentary elections were held in October and the new parliament elected the Prime Minister and Cabinet.

Post-Presidency 
In January 2012, Otunbayeva has established the International Public Foundation "Roza Otunbayeva Initiative". The main objective of the Foundation is to implement programs and projects that will contribute to the social, political and economic development of the Kyrgyz Republic. During a 2016 speech by her successor at a military parade on Ala-Too Square for the 25th anniversary of Kyrgyzstan's independence, Otunbayeva walked off the stage after President Atamabayev repeatedly criticized her government. 

During a speech at the Middlebury Institute of International Studies in May 2018, she claimed that the young Kyrgyz generation values freedom above all, saying that they "have been infected by freedom and it runs deep".

Honours and awards 
Roza Otunbayeva was listed as one of the 150 Most Influential Women in the World by Newsweek/Daily Beast 2011 Edition.

Otunbayeva has received France's "Legion of Honour" Award with the degree of Commander, as well as the highest order of Mongolia's "Polar Star" Award. She was awarded the Premio Minerva Medallion, which is presided over by the President of the Italian Republic, "For occupying the highest institutional role in Kyrgyzstan, and for her international activities promoting democracy and peace".

In 2011, Otunbayeva received an International Women of Courage Award, which is presented annually by the United States Department of State to women around the world who have shown leadership, courage, resourcefulness, and the willingness to sacrifice for others, especially while promoting women's rights. On December 13, 2012, the Eurasia Foundation (USA) awarded her with the 2012 Bill Maynes Award for demonstrating visionary leadership throughout Kyrgyzstan's constitutional transition and providing a lifelong example of public service.

Otunbayeva is a member of:
 Club de Madrid (Madrid)
 Governing Board of the Interstate Foundation of Humanitarian Cooperation of the Commonwealth of Independent States (CIS) (Moscow)
 Leadership Council of the Sustainable Development Solutions Network, a Global Initiative of the United Nations (New York)
 Board of the UN University for Peace (UPEACE) in Costa Rica
 Board of the UNESCO Mahatma Gandhi Institute of Education for Peace and Sustainable Development (New Delhi)
 IOM Migration Advisory Board (Geneva)
She is an Honorary Professor at the: 
 Shanghai University of Political Science and Law (China)
 Honorary Professor at the Ganjavi University (Azerbaijan)
She is also an Honorary Professor at:
 I. Razzakov Kyrgyz State Technical University
 B. Beishenalieva Kyrgyz State Arts and Culture University
 K. Tynystanov Issyk-Kul State University
 J. Balasagyn Kyrgyz National University
 K. Moldobasanova Kyrgyz National Conservatory
 MVD Academy of Kyrgyzstan
 Jalal-Abad State University
 K. Karasaev Bishkek Humanities University
 S. Naamatov Naryn State University

See also
2010 Kyrgyzstani uprising
List of elected and appointed female heads of state

References

External links

Kyrgyzstan: The Bittersweet Fruits Of The Revolution
Roza Otunbayeva interviews on Echo of Moscow 

|-

1950 births
21st-century Kyrgyzstani women politicians
21st-century Kyrgyzstani politicians
Ambassadors of Kyrgyzstan to Canada
Ambassadors of Kyrgyzstan to Ireland
Ambassadors of Kyrgyzstan to the United Kingdom
Ambassadors of Kyrgyzstan to the United States
Communist Party of Kirghizia politicians
Kyrgyzstani women diplomats
Female foreign ministers
Female heads of government
Female heads of state
Kyrgyz Revolution of 2010
Kyrgyzstani agnostics
Living people
Members of the Supreme Council (Kyrgyzstan)
Moscow State University alumni
People from Osh
Permanent Delegates of the Soviet Union to UNESCO
Presidents of Kyrgyzstan
Social Democratic Party of Kyrgyzstan politicians
Women presidents
Recipients of the International Women of Courage Award
Foreign ministers of Kyrgyzstan
Academic staff of Kyrgyz National University
Women ambassadors
People's commissars and ministers of the Kirghiz Soviet Socialist Republic
20th-century Kyrgyzstani women politicians
20th-century Kyrgyzstani politicians